Východná is a village and municipality in Liptovský Mikuláš District in the Žilina Region of northern Slovakia.

History
In historical records the village was first mentioned in 1269, at the foot of Kriváň, Slovakia's symbolic and often considered most beautiful mountain.

Culture 
Východná is home to one of the major folklore festivals in the country.

The festival has been organised since 1953 in the large open-air theatre overlooking the village early in the summer, usually during the first weekend of July. In 2006–2007, the premises of the open-air theatre were largely reconstructed.

The festival is held as part of the programmes of the International Council of Organizations for Folklore Festivals and Folk Art (C.I.O.F.F.). Every year it welcomes an average of 1,500 performers, and the number of visitors reaches 70,000 people. The magnificent scenic programme in the open-air theatre during the three festival days is completed by minor programmes, exhibitions and accompanying events engaging the visitors right into the centre of happening.

Geography
The municipality lies at an altitude of 775 metres and covers an area of 193.698 km². It has a population of about 2,500 people.

See also
Cenotaph in Východná

References

External links

Villages and municipalities in Liptovský Mikuláš District